A presidential palace is the official residence of the president in some countries. Some presidential palaces were once the official residences to monarchs in former monarchies that were preserved during those states' transition into republics. Some other presidential palaces were once the official residencies to governors in former colonies or subnational divisions that were preserved during their transition to independent states.

List

Africa

Americas

Asia

Europe

Oceania

See also
 Prime ministerial residences

References

External links
 World's Most Stunning Presidential Palaces - slideshow by The Huffington Post

it:Palazzo presidenziale